James McNally or Jim McNally may refer to:

 James McNally (American football), American football player and coach
 James McNally (musician), British musician, composer and producer of the band Afro Celt Sound System
 Jim McNally  (born 1943), American retired football coach
 Jim McNally (baseball) (died 2013), Major League Baseball umpire
 Jim McNally (sport shooter) (1931–2018), American
 Jim McNally, locker room attendant involved in the 2015 Deflategate controversy
 James Wilson (Irish nationalist) (1836–1921; born James McNally), Fenian who was transported as a convict to Western Australia